Lampropeltis mexicana thayeri, currently known as lampropeltis leonis, or Nuevo León kingsnake, variable kingsnake, or Thayer's kingsnake, is a nonvenomous snake belonging to the family Colubridae. Thayer's kingsnake is a subspecies of the mexicana group of the genus Lampropeltis. Thayer's kingsnake is endemic to the eastern slopes of the Mexican plateaus in Tamaulipas, Mexico. Thayer's kingsnake is known for producing offspring typically displaying three main variable phases within the same clutch from similar-coloured patterned parents.

Appearance 
The dorsal body scales of Thayer's kingsnake are primarily either red and black or solid black although their scale color patterns are highly variable.

Range 
Thayer's kingsnake is found on the eastern slopes of the Mexican plateaus in Tamaulipas, Mexico.

Behavior 
The behaviour of Thayer's kingsnake is similar to many of the other kingsnake species. Thayer's kingsnake is typically non-aggressive and reclusive and does well in captivity. Thayer's kingsnake requires a hiding place at all times and often prefers to hide in such.

Diet 
Thayer's kingsnake kills its prey by constriction and prefers a diet of lizards in the wild although they have been known to feed on rodents, frogs and other snakes. In captivity, Thayer's kingsnakes can be weaned onto rodents as their main food source.

Reproduction 
Thayer's kingsnakes are oviparous typically laying between six–14 eggs up to twice per year. Like many other colubrids, Thayer's kingsnakes usually mate in early spring following a winter cooling period.

Notes

References 

mexicana thayeri
Endemic reptiles of Mexico
Mexican Plateau